Coral Princess is a Coral-class cruise ship owned and operated by Princess Cruises line. The vessel, along with sister ship , was launched in 2002.  Coral Princess and Island Princess are part of the only five Panamax ships operated by Princess Cruises.

Route

During summer months, Coral Princesss main itinerary consists of 7-day Alaskan cruises from Vancouver, British Columbia, Canada, to Whittier, Alaska, US. During fall, winter and spring, Coral Princess runs 11-day Panama Canal partial-transit cruises with stops in Cartagena, Colombia, Colon, Panama, either Ocho Rios, Jamaica, or Grand Cayman (alternating cruises), Limon, Costa Rica, and Oranjestad, Aruba, with Fort Lauderdale, Florida, as its turnaround port.

Accidents and incidents

On 2 May 2013, Coral Princess suffered a fire when some flammable material in the engineering spaces accidentally ignited in the middle of the night.  It was quickly extinguished without anyone onboard being injured; however, minor amounts of smoke were detected by passengers as far up as Deck 8.

Coral Princess experienced an engine fire at approximately 2130 local time on 15 January 2020 while in the Drake Passage en route to Stanley, Falkland Islands. The ship had just completed a two-day transit of the Antarctic Peninsula when the fire occurred and was contained by the ship's on-board fire detection system; no passengers or crew were injured.

COVID-19 pandemic

News reports in early April 2020 indicated that the ship, with 1,020 passengers and 878 crew, with some suffering flu-like symptoms, was hoping to be allowed to dock at Port Everglades in Fort Lauderdale, Florida to allow passengers to disembark. A news item on 2 April 2020 stated that "Passengers have been confined to their rooms...when the company noticed a higher than normal number of flu-like cases on board."  Reports then specified that "out of 13 passengers and crew tested for COVID-19 on board the Coral Princess, 12 were positive." Officials in Broward County, Florida said that a plan was not yet in place to handle the situation. The ship had departed San Antonio, Chile on 5 March 2020, when the cruise line was still in full operation, and was not allowed to disembark passengers at Buenos Aires on 19 and 20 March. Passengers were in full lockdown as the vessel approached Florida.

A previous ship, the Holland America Line's , also with confirmed COVID-19 cases, had finally received permission on 2 April for most of her passengers to disembark at Port Everglades.

Coral Princess was diverted and finally docked at the Port of Miami on the afternoon of 4 April with its over 1,000 passengers and 878 crew members. Reports at the time indicated that two passengers had died and some others were ill. Only the few with symptoms of respiratory illness had been tested for COVID-19 and of those, 12 had tested positive. A CNN report at 6pm on 4 April indicated that an estimated 15 persons would stay on board for medical care. Those who were not ill were to disembark when flights to their destinations were available; this was expected to take some days. A subsequent report by the South Florida Sun-Sentinel, however, stated that four passengers were scheduled to be taken to Florida hospitals and added that 67 persons would not be allowed to disembark.

By 7 April, all but 90 passengers had disembarked; many had returned to the UK, Australia, California and Canada via charter flights. As of that date, three passengers had died.

The vessel left Port Miami on 10 April 2020 with its crew and 13 international passengers who were unable to return to their home countries due to travel restrictions. No destination was revealed but it appeared that the ship would initially remain at sea for a period of quarantine.

In October 2022, passengers and crew tested positive for COVID-19 off the coasts of Western Australia and were put in isolation.

References

External links
 Official website
 

2002 ships
Panamax cruise ships
Ships built by Chantiers de l'Atlantique
Ships of Princess Cruises
Cruise ships involved in the COVID-19 pandemic